Kabul University (KU;) is one of the major and oldest institutions of higher education in Afghanistan. It is in the 3rd District of the capital Kabul, near the Ministry of Higher Education. It was founded in 1931 by King Mohammed Nadir Shah, whose prime minister at the time was his younger brother, Sardar Mohammad Hashim Khan.

Approximately 22,000 students attend Kabul University. In August 2021, before the Taliban takeover, nearly half were female. The university reopened in February 2022, with classes separated by sex but relatively few changes to the curriculum.

History

Early history
Kabul University was established in 1932 during the reign of  King Mohammed Nadir Shah and during the government of  Prime Minister Mohammad Hashim Khan, opening its doors one year later to students from across the country. It benefitted from partnerships with the governments of Turkey, France, Germany and the United States.

The first Faculty of Medicine in Kabul was established by a group of Turkish professors of Medicine and Surgery led by Prof. Dr. Kamil Rıfkı Urga in 1932 in the region of Aliabad. The first teaching-university hospital, called the Aliabad Hospital, was also built here on the campus under the guidance and close supervision of Turkish architects and teaching physicians. In 1936 the Faculty of Law & Political Sciences in the same campus was established by Turkish Prof. Dr. Mehmed Ali Dağpınar. The Faculty of Law started to enroll students of law. Therefore, by then, these two faculties (Medicine and School of Law) put the foundation of the present-day Kabul University.

The first attending Turkish professors of medicine and surgery who had gone to Afghanistan under an official agreement between the governments of Afghanistan and the Turkish Republic served in Kabul University between 1932 and 1952. The first president (rector) of Kabul University and dean of the Faculty of Medicine was a well-known Turkish surgeon and anatomist, Prof. Dr. Urga, who together with 15 other Turkish physicians taught medicine and surgery for a period of 17 years. Later on, some additional teaching staff including a French professor called Dr. Pierre Bolange attended as the dean of the Faculty of Medicine after the previous Turkish dean, Prof. Zuhtu Bey, who left Kabul for Ankara in 1952. The first nine graduates of the Faculty of Medicine played significant roles in this country's administrative and university community reforms; two of them were Dr. Muhammad Yusuf (the prime minister) and Prof. Dr. Fattah Najeem.

Initially, the university accepted only male students, but from 1950 on it was open to women as well.

In the 1960s, foreign-educated scholars populated the campus, exposing the new generation to new topics such as communism, feminism and capitalism. Notable students influenced during this era included Ahmad Shah Massoud, Gulbuddin Hekmatyar, Dr. Faiz Ahmad, and Saydal Sokhandan. Many different political groups were influenced in the university such as Khalqists, Parchamites, Sholayees, and Ikhwanists. In a clash between Ikhwanis and Sholayees, a poet named Saydal Sokhandan was killed by Hekmatyar in the 1970s. Saydal was fired upon and shot by Gulbuddin during an argument.

During the governance of the People's Democratic Party of Afghanistan (PDPA), Kabul University lost several lecturers and staff. The majority of the university's faculty left during the ten-year period of unrest or civil war that followed after the fall of the PDPA government in 1992. The area around the university and Karte Char was a major battleground in the Afghan Civil War (1992–96).

2001 - 2021 
 
After the removal of the Taliban government in late 2001, the international community focused on rebuilding the educational institutions in Afghanistan. By January 2004 the campus had only 24 computers. As part of its recovery program, the university has established partnerships with four foreign universities, including Purdue University and the University of Arizona. Furthermore, the Information Technology Center was founded in 2002 with the cooperation of German Academic Exchange Service (DAAD) and Technical University of Berlin. The number of students in higher education had increased across the country from 22,717 in 2002 to 56,451 in 2008. By 2008, Kabul University was attended by 9,660 students, 2,336 (24%) of them being women.

It was reported in 2007 that Iran donated funds to the university's dentistry faculty and donated 25,000 books. The main library of Kabul University, which is the best-equipped library in Afghanistan, was built by the United States. It is equipped with computers, books and magazines. Nancy Dupree, wife of Louis Dupree, was the Director of the Afghanistan Center at the university.

In 2008, the campus of Kabul University was provided with local network facilities by the Information Technology center of Kabul University (ITCK). Each building is connected to the campus network and is provided with the internet connection from a fiber optic backbone. The Voice over IP (VoIP) technology was also part of the networking project, which improved the quality of telephone communication at the university level.

At the beginning of 2020, Chancellor Babury has introduced a new program for the change and development of Kabul University. Significant progress has been made in implementing this plan. This plan was vigorously implemented until the advent of the Taliban.

On 19 July 2019, a car bomb exploded outside the university. It killed 8 people and injured another 33.

ISIL gunmen attacked the university on 2 November 2020, killing 35 and wounding 56. The attack occurred at around 11:00. Afghan security officials claimed they have arrested the person who instigated the attack. The three gunmen were killed by Afghan and American forces who came to the scene.

Since 2021 
Following the 2021 Taliban offensive, the university fell under Taliban control.

The Taliban forcibly replaced Chancellor Mohammad Osman Babury, a longtime KU professor and expert on medicinal plants, with Mohammad Ashraf Ghairat, a Taliban fighter and former journalism student. Critics noted that Ghairat had no qualifications beyond running a small madrassah, and believe he was installed for his loyalty to the Taliban. At least 70 faculty members at the university resigned following Ghairat's installation, with the remainder demanding the Taliban rescind the installation. Ghairat had pledged to “to rid Kabul University of Western and infidel thoughts”, and to impose a policy of segregation, stating “As long as real Islamic environment is not provided for all, women will not be allowed to come to universities or work. Islam first.”

In October 2021, Ghairat was replaced by Osama Aziz, who holds a doctorate in Islamic Jurisprudence (Sharia law).  classes are still suspended and research at the university has come to a standstill. Faizullah Jalal, a university worker and a critic of the Taliban, was arrested in 2022.

Kabul University reopened on 26 February 2022, with female students attending in the morning and males in the afternoon. Other than the closure of the music department, few changes to the curriculum were reported. Additionally, the new administration has not formally prohibited male teachers from instructing female students. Female students are required to wear an abaya and a hijab to attend, although the strictness with which this regulation will be enforced remains to be seen, as some wore a shawl instead. Attendance was reportedly low on the first day, possibly due to lingering fears of the Taliban or the economic hardship affecting Afghans following foreign aid cuts and U.S. financial sanctions.

Structure 

The Faculty of Environment Science has three departments: Department of Environmental Protection, Department of Natural Resources and Management and Department of Natural Disaster Management.

The Faculty of Law and Political Sciences has four departments: Department of Public Law, Department of Criminal Law, Department of Private Law and Department of International Relations.
The Faculty of Computer Science has four departments: Software Engineering Department, Computer Science Department, Information Technology Department and Information System Department.
The Faculty of Economics has two shifts students (day and night), five active departments, three future planned departments. The day shifts' departments are: Finance Department, Enterprise Management Department, Econometric and Statistic Department, National Economies Department, Management Information Systems Department, Counting Department (Future Plan), Money and Banking Department (Future Plan) and Economic Development Department (Future Plan). The night shifts' departments are: Finance Department, Enterprise Management Department and National Economics Department.
The Faculty of Science has four departments: Department of Biology, Department of Mathematics, Department of Chemistry and Department of Physics.
The Faculty of Engineering has six departments: Department of Mechanical Engineering, Department of Electrical & Electronics Engineering, Department of Architectural Engineering, Department of Energy Engineering, Department of Civil Engineering and Department of Urban Planning and Design. The Faculty offers a master program in Electrical and Electronics Engineering.

The Faculty of Pharmacy has five departments: Department of Pharmacology-Toxicology, Department of Pharmaceutics, Department of Pharmacognosy, Department of Microbiology and Department of Biochemistry-Nutrition. It has eight laboratories. An estimated 400 students are taking classes there.
The Faculty of Agriculture has eight departments: Agronomy Department, Economics and Agricultural Extension Department, Forestry & Natural Resources Department, Department of Biotechnology and Seed Production, Department of Animal Sciences, Department of Soil Science and Irrigation, Horticulture Department, and Plant Protection Department.
The Faculty of Veterinary Medicine has five departments: Department of Animal Production, Department of Para Clinic, Department of Clinic, Department of Preclinical, and Department of Food Hygiene and Technology.
The Faculty of Journalism has two departments: Radio &TV Department and Press Department.
The Allama Iqbal Faculty of Arts built at a cost of around $10 million by neighboring country Pakistan, was established in 2010. The building contains 28 classrooms, two seminar-halls, a library, two computer labs, 20 faculty offices. Afghan and Pakistani officials inaugurated the building in July 2010.
The Faculty of Language and Literature have ten departments: Pashto Language and Literature Department, Dari Language and Literature Department, The English Department, Russian Language Department, German Language Department, Turkish Language Department, Department of French Language, Arabic Language Department, Spanish Language Department and Chinese Language Department.
The Faculty of Fine Arts have six departments: Sculpture Department, Painting Department, Graphic Department, Theatre Department, Music Department, Playwright and Screenwriting Department.
The Faculty of Islamic Studies have eight departments: Religious Jurisprudence, Principles of Islamic Jurisprudence, Belief and Philosophy, Narrations of Prophet, Interpretation of Quran, Manner and Eloquence, Preaching of Islam and Islamic Culture.
The Faculty of Social Science have three departments: Archaeology and Anthropology Department, Philosophy Department and History Department.
Psychology and Educational Science Faculty has six departments: Education, Psychology, Administration, Management, Advisor and Instruction.

National Centre for Policy Research 
The National Centre for Policy Research was established at Kabul University by the Ministry of Higher Education and Konrad Adenauer Foundation in 2003, and includes faculty in the departments of Law and Politics, Economics, and Social Science.

Library  

In 1992, the library held 200,000 books, 5,000 manuscripts, 3,000 rare books, periodicals, photographs and calligraphic specimens. Following a civil war, most materials were sold in book markets, burnt, destroyed, or lost. It served as the National Library of Afghanistan.

Notable alumni 
Notable graduates and former faculty of Kabul University include:
 Former Dean of Islamic law at Kabul University  Gholam Mohammad Niazi
 Former Afghan Prime Minister Mohammad Yusuf
 Former Afghan Prime Minister Mohammad Hashim Maiwandwal
 Former Afghan Prime Minister Mohammad Musa Shafiq
 Former Afghan Marxist head of state Hafizullah Amin
 Editor-in-Chief of national newspaper (1970s) Hafiz Sahar
 Afghan politician Tahir Badakhshi
 Afghan ambassador to Austria and former Afghan ambassador to Nordic countries Manizha Bakhtari
 Afghan poet Wasef Bakhtari
 Afghan activist Hamida Barmaki
 American archaeologist Nancy Dupree
 Former President of Afghanistan Babrak Karmal
 Former President of Afghanistan Mohammad Najibullah
 Afghan Marxist politician Anahita Ratebzad
 Former President of Afghanistan Nur Muhammad Taraki
 Former President of Afghanistan Burhanuddin Rabbani
 Former Afghan guerilla and military leader Ahmad Shah Massoud
 Afghan poet Khalida Furugh
 Nasrin Husseini

See also 
 Education in Afghanistan
 List of universities in Afghanistan

References

External links 

Official website of Kabul University
 , 22 November 2018, Voice of America.
 , 8 January 2014, USAIDAfghanistan.
 , 6 March 2011, Voice of America.

 
Universities in Afghanistan
Universities and colleges in Kabul
Educational institutions established in 1932
1932 establishments in Afghanistan
Libraries established in 1932